Tephritis arnicae is a species of picture-winged fly of the family Tephritidae, which are variously known as fruit-flies (North America) or gall flies (Britain and Ireland).

The larvae feed in the flowerheads of species of Arnica montana, Doronicum grandiflorum, D. austriacum and D. hungaricum.

Distribution
United Kingdom & Scandinavia, South to France, Bulgaria & Ukraine.

References

Tephritinae
Insects described in 1758
Taxa named by Carl Linnaeus
Diptera of Europe